Lucrezia Magistris (born 21 April 1999) is an Italian weightlifter, competing in the 59 kg category. She competed at the 2022 European Weightlifting Championships in Tirana, winning a silver medal in the 59 kg category.

She won the silver medal in her event at the 2022 European Junior & U23 Weightlifting Championships held in Durrës, Albania.

Achievements

References

External links 
 

Living people
1999 births
Italian female weightlifters
European Weightlifting Championships medalists
Competitors at the 2022 Mediterranean Games
Mediterranean Games gold medalists for Italy
Mediterranean Games silver medalists for Italy
Mediterranean Games medalists in weightlifting
21st-century Italian women